Etlingera subulicalyx is a monocotyledonous plant species first described by Theodoric Valeton, and given its current name by Rosemary Margaret Smith. Etlingera subulicalyx is part of the genus Etlingera and the family Zingiberaceae.

The species' range is Sumatra. No subspecies are listed in the Catalog of Life.

References 

subulicalyx
Taxa named by Rosemary Margaret Smith